Daehyun Elementary School is a public elementary school located in Daehyeon-dong, Nam-gu, Ulsan, South Korea. There are 962 students from kindergarten to the sixth grade at Daehyun during the 2013–2014 school year. About 80 teachers and other faculty are employed at Daehyun including workers completing their mandatory military service and one native-English-speaking teacher.

Daehyun has also been used as a high school academy after regular class hours. High school students receive credit towards their certificates for completing classes at Daehyun such as math, science, and English. Additionally, high school students work as mentors to elementary school students during summer and winter break to receive additional credit.

The school was founded on 8 July 1925 and was relocated to its current location on 1 March 1973.

School symbols 
The school's logo is a check mark inside of a cog wheel and symbolizes wisdom and health.

The school's flower is the chrysanthemum, symbolizing truth, purity, and cleanliness.

The school's tree is the ginkgo tree.

Academics 
At Daehyun, students study many subjects, including: Korean, English, Chinese characters, math, social studies, science, computers, art, physical education, music, health, ethics, and home economics.

There are programs to help students with learning disabilities as well as gifted students who need more challenging work.

Teams and activities 
Daehyun's baseball team is the only official sports team at the school. The team was created in 1986 and they have won first in three regional tournaments since then. Daehyun is the only elementary school in Ulsan that has a baseball team, and because of this, Daehyun has become a necessary school to attend if a student has hopes of becoming a career player. Some students even commute from outside the city to attend.

Daehyun's unofficial teams include: volleyball, soccer, basketball, badminton, ping-pong, dodge ball, tennis, track & field and jump rope.

After-school activities for Daehyun students include: piano, violin, recorder, danso, dance, cross stitching, reading club, art club, English drama club, Korean drama club, and computer club.

Special events 
Every year, Daehyun students participate in special events including sports day in the spring and the Daehyun talent show at the end of the school year.

One day every month, the students are encouraged not to waste any food at lunch, and are given stickers if they can finish all of their food.

Every Thursday is "Delicious Lunch Day" at the school where the students get an extra-delicious lunch at the school cafeteria.

Notable occasions 
The gymnasium opened for the first time on 26 October 2004. A new sports field was completed in 2012 and is used by the school's baseball and track & field  teams. Baseball teams from other schools and cities come to Daehyun Elementary for tournaments because it is the only school in Ulsan with a baseball team and a quality playing field.

Notable people 
Bae Eun-hye, a physical-education teacher at Daehyun until 2013, won a silver medal in the 2006 Doha Asian Games for the women's 70 kg judo event.

Jeong Ju-hyeon, a center fielder and second baseman for Sangmu Baseball Team, attended Daehyun Elementary.

Jun Won-tchack, a South Korean writer and broadcaster, graduated from Daehyun Elementary in 1966.

See also 

 Education in South Korea

References

External links 
 Official website 
 Ulsan Metropolitan Office of Education home page

1925 establishments in Korea
Educational institutions established in 1925
Elementary schools in South Korea
Schools in Ulsan
Nam District, Ulsan